is a railway station on the Kintetsu Railway Osaka Line in Kashiwara, Osaka Prefecture, Japan, serving Osaka Kyoiku University.

Layout
The station has two side platforms serving one track each.

Platforms

Number of users
In recent years, the survey results of the passengers on the day of the station are as follows.

Year           Number of people usur

 2015 11 10        6,455
 2012 11 13        6,204
 2010 11月9        6,056
 2008 11 18        6,364
 2005 11 8          5,781

Surroundings
 Osaka Kyoiku University Kashiwara Campus
 Kokubu Hospital

Adjacent stations

Railway stations in Japan opened in 1991
Railway stations in Osaka Prefecture